Sayed Gharib, also transliterated as Sayyid Gharib or Syed Ghraib, is a village in the Dujail district of Saladin Governorate, Iraq. The village lies beside Highway 1 a few kilometres south of the city of Balad and 120 kilometres southeast of the provincial capital, Tikrit. The national capital, Baghdad, is another 80 kilometres south.

Insurgency
In October 2009 four gunmen kidnapped five farmers in the area.

In June 2010 two Sahwa militiamen were killed and another was seriously injured by an explosive at a checkpoint in the area.

In July 2013 a policeman was reportedly shot by unidentified gunmen at a checkpoint.

On 3 January 2015, IraqiNews, citing an anonymous security source, reported that Iraqi security forces had liberated the village from Islamic State of Iraq and the Levant (ISIL/ISIS) militants. The source advised IraqiNews that "The security forces have managed to liberate the whole area of Sayed-Gharib, located 120 km south of Tikrit in the district of al-Dajil," adding that, "The clashes between the security forces and ISIS militants have resulted in the deaths of 7 ISIS snipers positioned inside some abandoned houses in the area."

References

Populated places in Saladin Governorate